William 'John' Rayden (born 1938), is a male former fencer who competed for England.

Fencing career
He represented England and won a gold medal in the team sabre, at the 1966 British Empire and Commonwealth Games in Kingston, Jamaica.

References

1938 births
English male fencers
Commonwealth Games medallists in fencing
Commonwealth Games gold medallists for England
Fencers at the 1966 British Empire and Commonwealth Games
Living people
Medallists at the 1966 British Empire and Commonwealth Games